The first season of the Tyler Perry's House of Payne began on June 21, 2006, and concluded on July 19, 2006. The season contained 10 episodes. Although this is the first season of the series, a set of 10 test episodes aired in the summer of 2006 in syndications.

Cast
 Allen Payne as Clarence James (C.J.) Payne Jr.
 LaVan Davis as Curtis Payne
 Cassi Davis as Ella Payne
 Larramie "Doc" Shaw as Malik Payne
 China Anne McClain as Jazmine Payne
 Demetria McKinney as Janine Payne
 Denise Burse as Claretha Jenkins

Episodes

Tyler Perry's House of Payne seasons
2006 American television seasons